Andrew John Pullan (1963 – 7 March 2012) was a New Zealand mathematician specialising in bio-electrical modelling.

Academic career

After attending  Aorere College in Mangere, Pullan received a scholarship to the University of Auckland where he studied mathematics before moving to the engineering school to work on biomedical engineering finite-element models of the heart and models of electrical activity in the gastrointestinal tract. His 2008 doctoral thesis was titled Quasilinearised infiltration and the boundary element method with Professor Ian Collins as his supervisor. He was appointed head of department from 2008 to 2010. He died in March 2012 of metastatic melanoma.

Selected works 
 New advances in gastrointestinal motility research 
 Mathematically modelling the electrical activity of the heart : from cell to body surface and back again

References

External links
 Google scholar 
 Blog

New Zealand mathematicians
Fellows of the Royal Society of New Zealand
University of Auckland alumni
Academic staff of the University of Auckland
1963 births
2012 deaths
People educated at Aorere College